This article displays the squads for the 2021 World Men's Handball Championship. Each team consists of up to 20 players.

Age, club, appearances and goals correct as of 13 January 2021.

Group A

Cape Verde
A 23-player squad was announced on 22 December 2020.

Head coach: José Tomás

Germany
A 20-player squad was announced on 21 December 2020. Moritz Preuss replaced Jannik Kohlbacher on 28 December 2020. On 11 January, Lukas Stutzke replaced Christian Dissinger. Tobias Reichmann was replaced by Patrick Groetzki on 16 January 2021.

Head coach:  Alfreð Gíslason

Hungary
A 21-player squad was announced on 21 December 2020. It was reduced to 19 later.

Head coach: István Gulyás

Uruguay
A 20-player squad was announced on 1 January 2021.

Head coach: Jorge Botejara

Group B

Brazil
A 20-player squad was announced on 30 December 2020. Matheus Francisco da Silva and Gabriel Ceretta were replaced by José Luciano and Guilherme Borges on 2 January 2021. César Almeida replaced Leonardo Terçariol on 11 January 2021. Thiagus dos Santos was removed from the squad on 12 January 2021. Guilherme Torriani replaced Felipe Borges on 14 January 2021.

Head coach: Leonardo Bortolini

Poland
A 20-player squad was announced on 13 January 2021.

Head coach: Patryk Rombel

Spain
An 18-player squad was announced on 9 January 2021.

Head coach: Jordi Ribera

Tunisia
A 21-player squad was announced on 3 January 2021. Achraf Margheli replaced Amine Bannour on 6 January 2021. It was cut to 20 on 10 January 2021.

Head coach: Sami Saïdi

Group C

Angola
A 21-player squad was announced on 27 December 2020.

Head coach: José Adelino

Croatia
A 21-player squad was announced on 1 January 2021. The final 20-player squad was announced on 11 January 2021.

Head coach: Lino Červar

Japan
A 20-player squad was announced on 2 January 2021.

Head coach:  Dagur Sigurðsson

Qatar
A 24-player squad was announced on 22 December 2020.

Head coach:  Valero Rivera López

Group D

Argentina
An 18-player squad was announced on 26 December 2020.

Head coach:  Manolo Cadenas

Bahrain
A 25-player squad was announced on 8 December 2020.

Head coach:  Halldór Jóhann Sigfússon

Denmark
A 20-player squad was announced on 17 December 2020. On 6 January Henrik Toft Hansen was replaced by Benjamin Jakobsen.

Head coach: Nikolaj Jacobsen

DR Congo
A 20-player squad was announced on 6 January 2021.

Head coach: Francis Tuzolana

Group E

Austria
A 20-player squad was announced on 1 January 2021.

Head coach:  Aleš Pajovič

France
A 20-player squad was revealed on 30 December 2020.

Head coach: Guillaume Gille

Norway
A 21-player squad was announced on 15 December 2020. On 21 December, Eivind Tangen replaced Magnus Abelvik Rød in the squad. Later, Robin Paulsen Haug was cut from the squad.

Head coach: Christian Berge

Switzerland
The squad was announced on 13 January 2021.

Head coach: Michael Suter

Group F

Algeria
A 21-player squad was announced on 2 December 2020. It was reduced to 20 on 11 January 2021.

Head coach:  Alain Portes

Iceland
A 20-player squad was announced on 4 January 2021.

Head coach: Guðmundur Guðmundsson

Morocco
A 23-player squad was announced on 7 January 2021.

Head coach: Noureddine Bouhaddioui

Portugal
A 19-player squad was announced on 30 October 2020.

Head coach: Paulo Pereira

Group G

Chile
A 20-player squad was announced on 21 December 2020.

Head coach:  Mateo Garralda

Egypt
A 21-player squad was announced on 27 December 2020.

Head coach:  Roberto García Parrondo

North Macedonia
A 20-player squad was announced on 12 January 2021.

Head coach: Danilo Brestovac

Sweden
A 19-player squad was announced on 17 December 2020.

Head coach:  Glenn Solberg

Group H

Belarus
A 24-player squad was announced on 30 December 2020. It was cut to 20 on 10 January 2021.

Head coach: Yuri Shevtsov

Russian Handball Federation Team
A 20-player squad was announced on 24 December 2020.

Head coach:  Velimir Petković

Slovenia
A 21-player squad was announced on 15 December 2020.

Head coach:  Ljubomir Vranjes

South Korea
Head coach: Kang Il-koo

References

World Men's Handball Championship squads
2021 squads